Yang Jen-ni is a Director-General.

Early life 
Yang was born in November 1954.

Education 
Yang received her bachelor's degree in Foreign Literature from National Taiwan University in 1978.

Career 
Yang currently serves as both the Director-General of Bureau of Foreign Trade (BOFT), Ministry of Economic Affairs, and the Deputy Chief Negotiator; she is also the first female General-Director in the BOFT since 1969. 

She joined the MOEA in 1983 and over the past 30 years has held a number of senior positions within MOEA and served at Taiwan's Permanent Mission to the WTO in Geneva.

References

1954 births
Living people
National Taiwan University alumni